Healthpeak Properties, Inc. is an American real estate investment trust that invests in real estate related to the healthcare industry including senior housing, life science, and medical offices. It is organized 2007 in Maryland and headquartered in Denver, Colorado with offices in Nashville and San Francisco. As of December 31, 2019, the company owned interests in 617 properties.

History
The company was founded in 1985 with 2 acute care hospitals and 22 skilled nursing facilities.

In 1985, the company became a public company via an initial public offering.

Effective September 2007, the company changed its name from Health Care Property Investors, Inc. to HCP, Inc.

In March 2008, the company was added to the S&P 500 Index.

In October 2016, the company completed the corporate spin-off of Quality Care Properties.

In October 2019, the company restructured its joint venture with Brookdale Senior Living. The company also changed its name to Healthpeak Properties, Inc.

In November 2020, the company announced they chose Denver for their new HQ, over Dallas and Nashville.

References

External links

1980s initial public offerings
Companies listed on the New York Stock Exchange
Companies based in Long Beach, California
Health care companies based in California
Real estate investment trusts of the United States